Léot of Brechin is the first known Abbot of Brechin. He appears in three charters. The first of these is a Scoto-Latin charter recorded in the notitiae on the Book of Deer, a charter which explicitly dates to "the eighth year of the reign of David" (1131) which styles him "Léot ab Brecini". The second of these is a charter of King David I of Scotland, dated by Archibald Lawrie to 1150, granting the lands of "Nithbren" and "Balcristin" to Dunfermline Abbey, where he is called "Leod abbate de Breichin". The third of these is a charter granted by King David to the church of St. Mary of Haddington dating to 1141 mentions a "Leod de Brechin".

He was almost certainly the father of the first known Bishop of Brechin, Samson.

Notes

References
Jackson, Kenneth H. (ed), The Gaelic Notes in the Book of Deer (The Osborn Bergin Memorial Lecture 1970), (Cambridge, 1972)
 Lawrie, Sir Archibald, Early Scottish Charters Prior to A.D. 1153, (Glasgow, 1905)

External links
Dauvit Broun, "Genealogical chart of ruling family of the Church of Brechin"

12th-century deaths
Medieval Gaels from Scotland
Scottish abbots
Year of birth unknown